The ASUN Conference Men's Basketball Coach of the Year award is given to the men's basketball head coach in the ASUN Conference voted as the best by the league's head coaches. It was first awarded at the end of the 1978–79 season, the first season of existence of what was then known as the Trans America Athletic Conference (TAAC). However, the conference did not establish a full regular-season schedule until 1979–80.

There has been one tie for the award, in 2019–20, while 11 coaches have received two or more awards. The program with the most awards (five) and most individual honorees (three), Mercer, left the ASUN in 2014. North Florida has the most awards among current members with three, while the only current member with more than one individual recipient is Lipscomb with two.

Key

Winners
School names reflect the current branding of their respective athletic programs, not necessarily those in use during a program's ASUN membership or in a specific season.

Footnotes

See also 
 ASUN Conference
 ASUN men's basketball tournament
 Associated Press College Basketball Coach of the Year
 Henry Iba Award
 NABC Coach of the Year
 Naismith College Coach of the Year

References 

Coach of the Year
NCAA Division I men's basketball conference coaches of the year
Awards established in 1979